John E. Mulroney (February 15, 1896 – May 18, 1979) was a justice of the Iowa Supreme Court and later a judge of the United States Tax Court.

Born at Ruthven, Palo Alto County, Mulrony attended Creighton University in Omaha, Nebraska in 1915, and then  served in the Rainbow Division during World War I, before receiving an LL.B. from the University of Iowa, in 1922.

He was a county attorney for Webster County, Iowa from 1929 to 1933, and was assistant attorney general of Iowa from 1939 to 1942. He became a justice of the Iowa Supreme Court from January 1, 1943, to October 11, 1955, appointed from Webster County, Iowa. He resigned from the Iowa Supreme Court to accept an appointment by President Dwight Eisenhower to a seat on the United States Tax Court. He retired on April 30, 1966, but was recalled to perform further judicial duties, continuing in that capacity until December 31, 1970.

Mulroney married Martha O'Connor in 1929.

References

1896 births
1979 deaths
Justices of the Iowa Supreme Court
University of Iowa College of Law alumni
Judges of the United States Tax Court
20th-century American judges
United States Article I federal judges appointed by Dwight D. Eisenhower